Magdalena Fręch was the defending champion but lost in the quarterfinals to Wang Qiang.

CoCo Vandeweghe won the title, defeating Bernarda Pera in the final, 6–3, 5–7, 6–4.

Seeds

Draw

Finals

Top half

Bottom half

Qualifying

Seeds

Qualifiers

Lucky losers

Qualifying draw

First qualifier

Second qualifier

Third qualifier

Fourth qualifier

References

Main Draw
Qualifying Draw

Thoreau Tennis Open - Singles